Slidell is an unincorporated community in Wise County, Texas, United States. Slidell was named for John Slidell, a 19th-century U.S. Senator and C.S.A. diplomat.

Education
The Slidell Independent School District serves area students and home to the Slidell High School Greyhounds.

Notes

Unincorporated communities in Texas
Unincorporated communities in Wise County, Texas
Dallas–Fort Worth metroplex